Guy of Burgundy, also known as Guy of Brionne, was a member of the House of Ivrea with a claim to the Duchy of Normandy. He held extensive land from his cousin, Duke William the Bastard, but lost it following his unsuccessful rebellion in the late 1040s.

Early life 

Guy was born to Reginald I, Count of Burgundy, and Alice of Normandy. As a younger son, he did not stand to inherit anything. As his mother was the daughter of Richard II, Duke of Normandy, Guy was sent to be raised at the Norman court in the early 1040s. It was hoped that the guardians of his young cousin, William the Bastard, would provide a future for Guy. Guy was William's household companion for a time, and as such did not have the resources needed to challenge ducal authority. 

Following the murder in 1040 of the leading Norman nobleman Gilbert of Brionne, a cousin of William and Guy, Guy received the lordship of Brionne in benefice. He was granted Vernon as well. Like his predecessor and cousin, Gilbert, Guy was a notable benefactor of the Abbey of Bec.

Rebellion 
Guy was not satisfied with the grants of land. In 1046, Guy emerged at the head of a conspiracy of Norman nobles discontented with his cousin's rule. The rebels needed a figurehead with a claim to the duchy, and Guy served the purpose as a legitimate grandson of Richard II. According to William of Poitiers, Guy either aimed at the ducal throne, which would have been unusually ambitious, or wanted to secure the greater part of the duchy for himself. Whether Guy merely felt sidelined at William's court or thought himself a better heir than his illegitimate cousin is ultimately unclear.

Guy was defeated by William and his overlord, King Henry I of France, at the Battle of Val-ès-Dunes. He retreated to his castle at Brionne, where the Duke besieged him there for three years before finally subduing him in 1049. William of Poitiers wrote that the Duke subsequently allowed Guy to remain at his court; William of Jumièges describes this as house arrest. As a punishment for his rebellion, Guy lost his castles.

References

Bibliography

Anscarids